Paniots Nine is an album by saxophonist and composer Joe Maneri which was recorded as a demo for Atlantic Records in 1963 and released on the Avant label in 1998 with an additional live recording from 1981.

Reception

The Allmusic review by Thom Jurek stated "This album is revelatory, capturing the use of weirdo time signatures like 9/8 in soloing and improvising, laced through with strange intervals and mode changes, and full of joy and drama. The boundaries blur between Eastern European wedding music and free jazz. The whirling clarinets and bowed bass played against a drummer who refused the traditional (in jazz, anyway) concept of rhythm in favor of counterrhythm atop the entire band, with the piano trailing in a rush. ... Paniots Nine provides the chance to hear his already well-developed ideas put into practice, and it is a delight".

Track listing
All compositions by Joe Maneri except where noted
 "Paniots Nine" (Peter Dolger) – 3:23
 "Shift Your Tail" – 5:53
 "Sopra" – 4:26
 "After Myself" – 5:17
 "Mountains" – 5:30
 "Why Don't You Go Far Away" – 3:58
 "The Horse" (Peter Dolger) – 6:21
 "Jewish Concert" – 11:15

Personnel 
Joe Maneri – tenor saxophone, clarinet
Don Burns (tracks 1–7), Greg Silberman (track 8) – piano
John Beal – bass (tracks 1–7)
Pete Dolger – drums (tracks 1–7)

References

Avant Records albums
Joe Maneri albums
1998 albums